Russell Reynolds (born 4 February 1951) is  a former Australian rules footballer who played with St Kilda in the Victorian Football League (VFL).

References

External links 		
		
		
		
		
		
		
Living people		
1951 births		
		
Australian rules footballers from Western Australia		
St Kilda Football Club players
Claremont Football Club players